The Madagascar women's national football team is the FIFA recognised senior women's A team for Madagascar. The team played their first FIFA matches in 2015. They were runner-up to Réunion in the 2015 Indian Ocean Island Games. They have competed in the COSAFA Women's Championship, in which they won a game against Comoros in 2019. The development of a national team in the country is problematic because of issues found on the continent and on the island, specifically including the lack of popularity of women's football as a participation sport in Madagascar.

History

In 1985, almost no country in the world had a women's national football team, including Madagascar, who did not play in a single FIFA-sanctioned match between 1950 and June 2012. In 2005, Zambia was supposed to host the regional COSAFA Women's Championship, with ten countries agreeing to send teams, including South Africa, Zimbabwe, Mozambique, Malawi, Seychelles, Mauritius, Madagascar, Zambia, Botswana, Namibia, Lesotho and Swaziland. Madagascar did not record a result from this competition. In 2006, there was a FIFA recognised senior A team that had two training sessions a week though they had not played a single game between 2000 and 2006.  A FIFA recognised senior A team existed in 2009. In 2010, the country did not have a team competing in the African Women's Championships during the preliminary rounds. The country did not have a team competing at the 2011 All Africa Games. In June 2012, the team was not ranked in the world by FIFA.

In 2015 and 2016, the team played several matches, of which four were FIFA recognized. Two of those were 4–0 wins against Comoros. The other games were in the Indian Ocean Games, where they were runner-up to Réunion. They made the final by winning a game against Mauritius. The team entered the COSAFA Women's Championship three years in a row from 2017 to 2019. After losing all three games in the group stage in 2017, they drew one game in 2018 against Botswana and won one game in 2019 against Comoros.

Results and fixtures

The following is a list of match results in the last 12 months, as well as any future matches that have been scheduled.

Legend

2022

Coaching staff

Current coaching staff

Manager history

Players

Current squad
The following players are the players listed as the latest selection on FMF's website
Caps and goals correct as of 14 August 2022

Recent call-ups
The following players have been called up to a Madagascar squad in the past 12 months.

Records

*Players in bold are still active, at least at club level.

Most capped players

Top goalscorers

Honours

Regional
Football at the Indian Ocean Island Games
  Runners-up: 2015

Competitive record

FIFA Women's World Cup

Olympic Games

*Draws include knockout matches decided on penalty kicks.

Africa Women Cup of Nations

COSAFA Women's Championship

*Draws include knockout matches decided on penalty kicks.

Sources: COSAFA, Soccerway

See also

 Sport in Madagascar
 Football in Madagascar

References

External links
 Malagasy Football Federation 

women
African women's national association football teams